Peles may refer to:

 Keren Peles (born 1979), Israeli female singer-songwriter and pianist
 Peles (river), a river in Perm Krai, Russia

See also 
 Peleș (disambiguation)

Hebrew-language surnames